Chaturbhuj Doshi (1894–1969) was a Hindi and Gujarati writer-director of Indian cinema. He was one of the top Gujarati screenplay writers, who helped script stories for the Punatar productions. He is stated to be one of the leading figures who launched the Gujarati film industry with work on notable films like Gunsundari (1948) and Nanand Bhojai (1948). Doshi, was “well known” for his family socials and had become “a celebrity in his own right”. He made a name for himself as a journalist initially and was referred to as the "famous journalist" and publicist by Baburao Patel, editor of Filmindia.

His debut film as a director was Gorakh Aya (1938), produced by Ranjit Movietone, though he joined Ranjit in 1929, as a scriptwriter. In 1938, he directed another film for Ranjit, a social comedy, The Secretary, and both films were box-office successes for Doshi. His forte was socials, regularly adapting stories and novels for films. He worked initially on comedies like Secretary and Musafir (1940), but then "shifted to more significant films".

Early life and career
Chaturbhuj Anandji Doshi was born in Kathiawar, Gujarat, British India. He was educated at the University of Bombay, and after graduation he started work as a journalist for a daily, Hindustan (1926), working  for editor Indulal Yagnik.  His entry into films was working as a scenarist in the silent era for directors like Jayant Desai, Nandlal Jaswantlal, and Nanubhai Vakil. He joined Ranjit Movietone in 1929, and wrote stories and screenplay for several of Ranjit films.

Career
Gorakh Aya (Gorakh has come) in 1938, was the first film directed by Doshi. It was produced by Ranjit Movietone  with screenplay by Gunvantrai Acharya and dialogues by P. L. Santoshi. The music, termed "good" was composed by Gyan Dutt. Baburao Patel's review in the September 1938 issue was favourable to the director "Directed by a man who enjoys a good reputation as a journalist… Mr. Chaturbhuj Doshi has given an excellent account of himself as a director considering that this is his very first effort", claiming it to be the "best picture coming out during the year from the Ranjit Studio".

The Secretary in 1938, was a "riotous comedy", starring Madhuri as a rich heiress in love with her secretary played by Trilok Kapoor. Charlie played the third angle causing friction, and was described as the "mainstay" of the film. The music was composed by Gyan Dutt, who became a regular in most of the films directed by Doshi.

Musafir in 1940 was a comedy costume drama, which had Charlie playing a prince who on his return finds his kingdom in disarray. Baburao Patel commended his acting in Filmindia, calling him "versatile" and "inimitable".

Bhakta Surdas, a devotional film directed by Doshi in 1942, is stated to be the "most famous" of the several versions made. It starred K. L. Saigal and Khursheed "the singing idol(s) of millions", winning "unprecedented popularity" everywhere.

Maheman (1942) starred Madhuri, Ishwarlal, Shamim and Mubarak. Music director Bulo C. Rani had come to Bombay in 1942, and joined Ranjit Studios assisting Khemchand Prakash in music direction. Prakash gave him a song to sing in Mehman, "Rootha Pyar Mein", which was "appreciated" and became a "popular number".

Doshi helped enormously in the development of the Gujarati cinema. During 1948-49 he directed three successful Gujarati films which "brought immense success to the industry". The success of the Gujarati film Kariyavar in 1948, directed by Chaturbhuj Doshi from a story by Shaida, called Vanzari Vaav, helped establish the Gujarati film industry along with other films like Vadilo Ne Vanke (1948) by Ramchandra Thakur and Gadono Bel (1950) by Ratibhai Punatar. His next Gujarati film was Jesal Toral (1948) based on folk-lore, which proved a big box-office success. In 1949, Doshi directed another Gujarati film, Vevishal, an adaptation of Meghani's novel of the same name.

He also wrote stories, and one of his stories Pati Bhakti was used in the Tamil film En Kanawar (1948) produced by Ajit Pictures, which starred the Veena maestro, S. Balachander, who was also the debut director and music composer for the film.

Death
Chaturbhuj Doshi died on 21 January 1969 in Bombay, Maharashtra, India.

Filmography
List:

References

External links
 

1894 births
1969 deaths
Film directors from Mumbai
20th-century Indian film directors
Indian male screenwriters
Film directors from Gujarat
Hindi-language film directors
Gujarati people
20th-century Indian screenwriters
20th-century Indian male writers